The 2019–20 Virginia Tech Hokies women's basketball team represented Virginia Polytechnic Institute and State University during the 2019–20 NCAA Division I women's basketball season. The Hokies, led by fourth year head coach Kenny Brooks, played their home games at Cassell Coliseum as members of the Atlantic Coast Conference.

The Hokies finished the season 21–9 and 11–7 in ACC play to finish in a tie for fourth place.  As the fifth seed in the ACC tournament, they lost to Wake Forest in the Second Round.  The NCAA tournament and WNIT were cancelled due to the COVID-19 outbreak.

Previous season
They finished the 2018–19 season 22–12, 6–10 in ACC play to finish in a tie for tenth place. They advanced to the second round of the ACC women's tournament where they lost to Clemson. They received an automatic bid to the Women's National Invitation Tournament where they defeated Furman and VCU in the first and second rounds before losing to James Madison in the third round.

Off-season

Recruiting Class

Source:

Roster

Schedule

Source:

|-
!colspan=9 style=| Non-conference regular season

|-
!colspan=9 style=| ACC regular season

|-
!colspan=9 style=| ACC Women's Tournament

Rankings
2019–20 NCAA Division I women's basketball rankings

See also
 2019–20 Virginia Tech Hokies men's basketball team

References

Virginia Tech
Virginia Tech
Virginia Tech
Virginia Tech Hokies women's basketball seasons